Lagos state is made up of five administrative divisions, namely, Ikorodu, Ikeja, Epe, Badagry, and Lagos Island, with Ikeja being the Capital. The five divisions consists of a total of 20 Local Government Areas and 37 Local Council Development Areas (LCDAs).

The LCDAs include Agbado/Oke-Odo, Agboyi-Ketu, Ayobo-Ipaja, Bariga, Egbe-Idimu, Ejigbo, Igando-Ikotun, Ikosi-Isheri, Isolo, Mosan-Okunola, Odi Olowo-Ojuwoye, Ojodu, Ojokoro, Onigbongbo and Orile Agege.

References

 
Nigeria geography-related lists
Lists by population